The Omaha Marathon is an annual marathon held in Omaha, Nebraska, United States. The 2010 marathon was the 35th edition, meaning that the race was first run in 1975. The event is a qualification event for the Boston Marathon. Today, runners have the option of running a half-marathon or 10 kilometers instead. The 2010 race was held on September 26 and there were 608 finishers.

On May 1, 2013, it was announced that the previously all-volunteer, non-profit race would be taken over by HITS, Inc. and made part of the HITS Running Festivals.

Course
The route has 17 miles of flat terrain and the running surface is mostly concrete or asphalt. Part of the route passes by the Missouri River.

References

External links
Official site of the Omaha marathon

Marathons in the United States
History of Omaha, Nebraska
Tourist attractions in Omaha, Nebraska